The Beast in the Jungle is a 2023 internationally co-produced drama film directed by Patric Chiha, from a screenplay by Chiha, Axelle Ropert and Jihane Chouaib, freely adapted from the 1903 novella of the same name by Henry James, and starring Anaïs Demoustier, Tom Mercier and Béatrice Dalle. The film is a co-production between France, Belgium and Austria. It made its world premiere in the Panorama section of the 73rd Berlin Film Festival on 17 February 2023.

Plot
For 25 years, from 1979 to 2004, a man and a woman wait together for a mysterious event in a big nightclub.

Cast
 Anaïs Demoustier as May
 Tom Mercier as John
 Béatrice Dalle as The Physiognomist
 Martin Vischer as Pierre
 Sophie Demeyer as Alice
 Pedro Cabanas as Mr. Pipi
 Mara Taquin as Céline
 Bachir Tlili as Yacine

Production

Development
In July 2017, it was announced that director Patric Chiha was writing the screenplay for his next film, The Beast in the Jungle, freely adapted from the 1903 novella of the same name by American-British author Henry James. On 15 April 2019, British magazine Screen Daily reported that French actor Gaspard Ulliel had signed on to play the protagonist of the film alongside Luxembourg actress Vicky Krieps as the female lead. The film was scheduled to start shooting in Winter 2019 for a 2020 release. Chiha described this film as a "love story" and a "tale of an obsession".

On 24 November 2021, Cineuropa reported that French actress Anaïs Demoustier, Israeli actor Tom Mercier and French actress Béatrice Dalle had been cast for the main roles and that filming would begin on 29 November 2021 in Brussels.

The Beast in the Jungle reunites director Patric Chiha with producer Charlotte Vincent of Paris-based company Aurora Films, who produced his two previous feature films, Domain (2009), and Boys Like Us (2014). Les Films du Losange handled the international pre-sales for the film at the 2019 Cannes Film Festival, and also took the French distribution rights. The film is a co-production between France's Aurora Films, along with Belgium's Frakas Productions and Austria's WILDart Film.The production is 42.49% French, 39.27% Belgian, and 18.24% Austrian, and it had the support of the CNC, the Wallonia-Brussels Federation, ÖFI (Austrian Film Institute), BeTV, Proximus, RTBF, Screen Brussels, Cinémage, Arte/Cofinova, development aid from the CNC, MEDIA and Procirep.

Filming
Filming took place in Vienna, Austria, and in Brussels, Bruxelles-Ville, and Saint-Josse-ten-Noode in Belgium between 11 November 2021 and 14 January 2022. The club Mirano in Brussels served as the set for the nightclub in the film.

Marketing
On 6 February 2022, Les Films du Losange shared on their Twitter account a behind the scenes image from the film showing the actors dancing at the nightclub.

The first stills from the film were unveiled on 12 January 2023. A teaser trailer and the first clip from the film featuring Anaïs Demoustier and Tom Mercier were unveiled by Les Films du Losange on 18 January 2023.

Release
The film made its world premiere in the Panorama section of the 73rd Berlin Film Festival on 17 February 2023. It will be released theatrically in France by Les Films du Losange and in Belgium by O'Brother.

Awards and nominations

References

External links 
 

2023 films
2023 drama films
French romantic drama films
Belgian romantic drama films
Austrian romantic drama films
2020s French-language films
2023 independent films
French-language Belgian films
2020s French films
Films set in 1979
Films set in 2004
Films based on works by Henry James
Films based on British novels
Films shot in Vienna
Films shot in Brussels
2023 LGBT-related films
French LGBT-related films
Belgian LGBT-related films
Austrian LGBT-related films
LGBT-related romantic drama films